The 1980 Chico State Wildcats football team represented California State University, Chico as a member of the Far Western Conference (FWC) during the 1980 NCAA Division II football season. Led by seventh-year head coach Dick Trimmer, Chico State compiled an overall record of 5–5 with a mark of 3–2 in conference play, tying for second place in the FWC. The team was outscored by its opponents 203 to 181 for the season. The Wildcats played home games at University Stadium in Chico, California.

Schedule

References

Chico State
Chico State Wildcats football seasons
Chico State Wildcats football